Robert Harry (fl. 1373–1388), of Winchelsea, Sussex, was an English politician.

He was a Member (MP) of the Parliament of England for Winchelsea in 1373, May 1382 and Feb. 1388.

References

Year of birth unknown
Year of death unknown
English MPs 1373
People from Winchelsea
English MPs May 1382
English MPs February 1388